The Roman Catholic Diocese of Caxito is a diocese located in the city of Caxito in the Ecclesiastical province of Luanda in Angola.

History
 6 June 2007: Established as Diocese of Caxito from the Metropolitan Archdiocese of Luanda

Special churches
The Cathedral of the diocese is Catedral Sant’Ana in Caxito.

Leadership
 António Francisco Jaca, S.V.D. (6 June 2007 - 26 March 2018), appointed Bishop of Benguela
 Maurício Camuto, C.S.Sp. (15 June 2020 - present)

See also
Roman Catholicism in Angola

Sources
 GCatholic.org
 Catholic-hierarchy

Roman Catholic dioceses in Angola
Christian organizations established in 2007
Roman Catholic dioceses and prelatures established in the 21st century
Roman Catholic Ecclesiastical Province of Luanda